The Imperial County of Rantzau was an immediate state of the Holy Roman Empire.  Its territory is more or less congruent with the present Amt Rantzau.

History 
In 1650 or 1651, Rantzau became an immediate county and state of the Holy Roman Empire. In 1726, it was annexed by the Danish rulers, after  (1688-1734), had murdered his brothers and was imprisoned. Wilhelm Adolf died in 1734 and Rantzau was inherited by the Duchy of Holstein, which was reigned by the Danish kings and its secundogenitures.

Origin in the House of Holstein

References

External links
 Map of the County of Rantzau in 1730

1650 establishments in the Holy Roman Empire
Counties of the Holy Roman Empire